Top Notch is a summit located in Central New York Region of New York located in the Town of Fairfield in Herkimer County, southeast of Fairfield.

References

Mountains of Herkimer County, New York
Mountains of New York (state)